Sima Zhen (679–732), courtesy name Zizheng (Tzu-cheng; 子正), was a Tang dynasty Chinese historian born in what is now Jiaozuo, Henan.

Sima Zhen was one of the most important commentators on the Shiji.  His commentary is known as the Shiji Suoyin, which means "Seeking the Obscure in the Records of the Grand Historian".

References

Further reading 
 Schwaab-Hanke, Dorothee, Why did Sima Zhen want to correct the Shiji's account of High Antiquity? Paper submitted to the IJSCS Conference 'Thought, Body, Culture. New Approaches to Chinese Historical Studies', to be held at the National Ts'ing-hua University, Hsinchu, Taiwan, Nov. 12-14, 2004. Click here for her preliminary draft.

External links
Shiji "Records of the Grand Scribe" — Chinaknowledge.de.
Ricci Library Catalog

679 births
732 deaths
Tang dynasty historians
8th-century Chinese historians
Writers from Jiaozuo
Historians from Henan